Gours may refer to:
 Rimstone
 Gours, Gironde, France
 Les Gours, Charente, France